The 2022–23 season is Korona Kielce's 50th season in existence and the club's first season back in the top flight of Polish football. In addition to the domestic league, Korona Kielce will participate in this season's edition of the Polish Cup. The season covers the period from 1 July 2022 to 30 June 2023.

Players

First-team squad

Out on loan

Other players under contract

Pre-season and friendlies

Competitions

Overview

Ekstraklasa

League table

Results summary

Results by round

Matches
The league fixtures were announced on 1 June 2022.

Polish Cup

Statistics

Goalscorers

References

Korona Kielce
Korona Kielce